Maintenance Command is a command of the Indian Air Force. It was raised as Maintenance Group at Chakeri in Kanpur in 1950. In 1955, it was designated as Maintenance Command. Its current headquarters is located at Vayusena Nagar in Nagpur (Maharashtra); it handles the repair, overhaul and maintenance of all aircraft, helicopters and other equipment. MC has about nine Base Repair Depots taking care of the overhaul and maintenance of various types of aircraft.

History
The Maintenance Command was established on 26 January 1955. Group Captain Harjinder Singh was the first Commanding Officer (CO). Harjinder Singh, a legendary engineering officer with many firsts to his credit was at the helm of the command until his retirement in 1963. The appointment of the CO was upgraded to Air Officer Commanding (AOC) in 1958 when Singh was promoted to Air Commodore. It was further upgraded to Air Officer Commanding-in-Chief (AOC-in-C) when he was promoted to the rank of Air Vice Marshal. In 1971, the appointment of AOC-in-C was upgraded to the three-star rank of Air Marshal.

Organisation
The command's Base Repair Depots include:
1 Base Repair Depot Kanpur-Chakeri Various Overhaul
2 Base Repair Depot Gwalior-Maharajpur Various Overhaul
3 Base Repair Depot Chandigarh Mi-8, Mi-17, Mi-25, Mi-35 Overhaul
4 Base Repair Depot Kanpur-Chakeri Various Overhaul
5 Base Repair Depot Coimbatore-Sulur Various Overhaul
7 Base Repair Depot Tughlakabad- New Delhi Various Missile System
9 Base Repair Depot Pune, Various Overhaul
11 Base Repair Depot Ojhar MiG-23, MiG-29 Overhaul
18 Base Repair Depot Jodhpur MiG-21 Overhaul

See also
 Training Command (India)

References

Commands of the Indian Air Force
Military units and formations of the Indian Air Force
Air force logistics units and formations